"The Six Thatchers" is the first episode of the fourth series of the British television programme Sherlock and the eleventh episode overall. The episode was first broadcast on BBC One, BBC First, PBS and Channel One on 1 January 2017.

Plot
Mycroft (Mark Gatiss) presents doctored footage of Charles Augustus Magnussen's death ("His Last Vow") being shot, so that it appears to the public as though Magnussen was shot accidentally by a sniper.  Sherlock (Benedict Cumberbatch) and a committee chaired by Lady Smallwood are attending.  Sherlock is freed, and resolves to wait for Moriarty's (Andrew Scott) posthumous revenge.

Mary Watson (Amanda Abbington) gives birth to a daughter, who is named Rosamund Mary.  John (Martin Freeman) befriends a woman he met on a bus.  It is hinted to be an affair, but John texts the woman to say that it's over.

Mycroft and Scotland Yard detectives including Greg Lestrade (Rupert Graves) bring Sherlock various cases, hoping it will reveal Moriarty's scheme.  One case involves the son of the Conservative cabinet minister Charlie Welsborough.  The son is found dead in a car crash, despite having been on a gap year in Tibet.  Sherlock quickly solves the case, and reveals that the son was hiding in the car, planning to surprise his father, but died from a seizure.  Sherlock notes a missing bust of Margaret Thatcher at the victim's home, finding that it was stolen and smashed upon the front porch.  Lestrade reveals to Sherlock that four other busts made in the series are smashed.  Hunting the last, Sherlock encounters a culprit.  They fight, but the culprit escapes.  In the center of the last bust is a memory stick.

Questioned by Sherlock, Mary relates her past as a freelance agent on a team called 'A.G.R.A.'.  Each had a memory stick containing their confidential material, lest anyone be betrayed by another.  Six years prior, a rescue mission of hostages at the British embassy in Tbilisi went wrong, when a coup d'état (set off by a code word "Ammo") killed everyone except Ajay (Sacha Dhawan) and Mary.
Sherlock tries to stop Mary from going after Ajay, but Mary drugs him and escapes.

Mary travels across the world following a random path, but, having planted a tracking device in the memory stick, Sherlock and John follow her to Morocco.  Ajay arrives and attempts to kill all three.  Ajay reveals that while being tortured in Tbilisi, he heard words "Ammo" and "the English woman", which Ajay assumed to be Mary.  He escaped and hid the memory stick in a half-made bust, then  sought revenge on Mary, believing that she had betrayed them.  They fight, but Ajay is shot by local police.

Sherlock deduces that 'Ammo' should be Amo, the Latin word for "I love", suggesting Lady Smallwood, whose codename is Love.  Questioned by Mycroft, Smallwood claims to be innocent.  Sherlock meets Smallwood's secretary Vivian Norbury in the London Aquarium.  Vivian confesses that she tipped the terrorists off in Georgia, using the code "Amo", thus eliminating the hostages and the 'A.G.R.A.' team.  Her motive was killing the British ambassador, who had found out that Vivian had sold national secrets.  John, Mycroft and the police arrive, and Vivian shoots at Sherlock, but Mary jumps in the way, taking the bullet.  Mary professes her love and gratitude for John and Sherlock, and dies.  John, grief-stricken, blames Sherlock, who had vowed to protect Mary.

In his home, Mycroft finds a sticky note reading "13th", and goes to "Sherrinford".  Sherlock visits John's therapist but is unable to discuss his issue.  Mrs. Hudson gives Sherlock a DVD, which is a posthumous message from Mary.  In the video, Mary asks Sherlock to 'Save John Watson'.  Sherlock attempts to visit John, but Molly informs Sherlock that John wishes for anyone's help but Sherlock's.

Production

Locations
Series 4 was primarily filmed at Pinewood Studio Wales.

Several location scenes for this episode were filmed in London: scenes involving the bloodhound were filmed at Borough Market and Trinity Church Square in Southwark; Cumberbatch was also filmed on Vauxhall Bridge running towards the SIS Building. Also filming occurred in the Jemaa el-Fnaa square in Marrakesh, Morocco.

References to Arthur Conan Doyle
Joanna Robinson of Vanity Fair, notes that Holmes' request to be reminded of Norbury as an example of his over-confidence is a reference to "The Adventure of the Yellow Face". The other reference to Doyle's "Adventure of The Yellow Face" is when John Watson says to Mary: "I might not be a very good man, but I am better than you give me credit for." This sentence was spoken by Mr Grant Munro to his wife Effie (who, like Mary Watson in "Sherlock", was also hiding a secret) in "The Adventure of The Yellow Face."
"The Six Thatchers" is based loosely on "The Adventure of the Six Napoleons". At one point, Sherlock believes that the suspect is hunting for the black pearl, which he had been asked to look into earlier and dismissed as uninteresting, but it is soon revealed that the suspect is actually hunting for a memory stick containing information about Mary Watson's past.

Broadcast and reception
The episode premiered in the United Kingdom, the United States, Australia and Latin America simultaneously. In the UK, it was premiered at 8:30 pm GMT on BBC One. In the US, it premiered at 9:00 pm ET/PT on PBS. In Australia, it premiered on subscription streaming service Stan at 10:00 pm AEDT on 2 January. In Latin America, it premiered at 1:00 am GMT on BBC Entertainment.

The Six Thatchers received mixed reviews. The Guardian was positive, saying "Cumberbatch channels Bond in the most explosive outing yet". IGN gave a mixed review a 5.5/10 calling it "Mediocre" and "Sherlock returns with a confused and confusing case involving Margaret Thatcher's head." Digital Spy called it "satisfying enough" and saying "'The Six Thatchers' is an engaging outing with one fatal flaw. Everything works... apart from the one thing that really needs to." The Telegraph gave a good review with a rating of 4/5 stars, calling it "a dizzying triumph of complex plotting." After Ralph Jones, in an opinion piece in The Guardian, criticised the episode for making Sherlock into a James Bond-style action hero, Mark Gatiss wrote in personally and responded in the form of verse.

References

External links
 

2017 British television episodes
Television episodes written by Mark Gatiss
Sherlock (TV series) episodes